Following the German invasion of Poland, the Kingdom of Nepal declared war on Germany on September 4, 1939. Once Japan entered the conflict, sixteen battalions of the Royal Nepalese Army fought on the Burmese front. In addition to military support, Nepal contributed guns, equipment as well as hundreds of thousands of pounds of tea, sugar and raw materials such as timber to the Allied war effort.

During World War II, there was an internal treaty between Nepal and Britain about the mobilization of Nepalese soldiers. In addition to Royal Nepal Army's troops, Nepalese fought in the British Gurkha units and were engaged in combat all over the world. Gurkha troops were part of the Allied occupation force in Japan.

The Nepali units that took part were Sri Nath, Kalibox, Surya Dal, Naya Gorakh, Barda Bahadur, Kali Bahadur, Mahindra Dal, Second Rifle, Bhairung, Jabbar Jung, Shumsher Dal, Sher, Devi Dutta, Bhairab Nath, Jagannath and Purano Gorakh Battalions. Aside from that, there were many high-ranking Nepalese in the joint Army HQ. Commander-in–Chief Kiran Shamsher Rana and Field Marshal Nir Shumsher Rana were liaison officers from the Royal Nepalese Army.

When Japan went to war with the United Kingdom in December 1941, the British presence was threatened in the Indian subcontinent. Britain deployed its troops in India to the Burma front. Nepalese battalions – Mahindra Dal, Sher, Kali Bahadur and Jagannath - were also deployed. These Nepalese battalions fought under the Allied Command. The Jagannath Battalion took part as engineers in order to construct tracks, bridges, water points, etc.

Nepalese troops fought with distinction in the British 14th Army under Lieutenant General William Slim and helped force the eventual Japanese retreat. Finally, following the atomic bomb attacks on Hiroshima and Nagasaki, Japan surrendered. Most Nepalese troops were withdrawn to Kathmandu in October 1945. A grand victory parade was held on 28 October 1945 where many Nepalese soldiers, officers and associated British officers were honored for their appreciable performances. In the Victory Parade at London in 1946, the Royal Nepalese Army was led by the Commanding Officer Sir Baber Shamsher Jang Bahadur Rana. His youngest son, Major-General Subikhyat-Tri-Shakti-Patta, Prasidha-Prabala-Gorkha-Dakshina-Bahu Sir Brahma Shamsher Jang Bahadur Rana, KCIE fought in the war and was decorated with Assam-Burma Medal (1945), British 39/45 & Burma stars, Defence and War medals (1945).

References

Further reading

External links
 History of Nepalese Army at the official website of the Nepalese Army.

World War II
World War II
World War II
Military units and formations of the United Kingdom in World War II
20th century in Nepal
 
World War II national military histories
Asia in World War II
1939 in Nepal